N2 or N-2 may refer to:

 Dinitrogen (N₂)

Arts and media
 A model number of the Yamaha AvantGrand piano
 "N2", a 2011 song by Japanese indie rock band Asian Kung-Fu Generation, on the album Landmark
 Network 2 (now RTÉ Two), an Irish television station, which used the branding "N2" between 1997-2004
 NicoNico, a video sharing website

Science and technology

Biology and medicine
 N200 (neuroscience), an event-related potential (ERP) component in the 200-300 ms poststimulus range
 A non-small cell lung carcinoma staging code for Metastasis to ipsilateral mediastinal or subcarinal lymph nodes
 A para formaldehyde-based filling material for root canals, also called Sargenti paste
 A strain of the Caenorhabditis elegans var. Bristol model worm

Transportation technology
 N2, gauges that monitor the power turbine section in a jet engine

 N-2, an Armenian multiple rocket launcher system
 N-2 rocket, a 1981 Japanese derivative of the American Delta rocket
 A type of large goods vehicle
 GNR Class N2, a 1920 British 0-6-2T steam locomotive class
 USS N-2 (SS-54), a 1917 N-class coastal defense submarine of the United States Navy

Other uses in science and technology
 N2 diagram, in systems engineering, a function-to-function data interchange
 DSC-N2, a 2006 Sony Cyber-shot series digital camera

Transit

 Several roads; see List of N2 roads
 N2 (Long Island bus)
 London Buses route N2
 South East Airlines (IATA airline designator)
 Kabo Air (IATA airline designator)
 Carretera Nacional N-II, former name for the Route Nacional from Madrid to Barcelona and France

Other uses 
 A United States Navy term for a senior military intelligence officer
 N2 Gateway, a housing project along the N2 freeway in Cape Town, South Africa
 N2, a postcode district in the N postcode area
 The fourth level in the Japanese Language Proficiency Test

See also 
 NO2 (disambiguation)
 NII (disambiguation)